Resident agent may refer to:

 Registered agent
 FBI Special Agent assigned to a small resident office